Zhongshanmen Subdistrict is a subdistrict located in the southern side of Hedong District, Tianjin. it shares border Shanghang Road and Wanxing Subdistricts to the northeast, Erhaoqiao Subdistrict to the southeast, Fumin Road Subdistrict to the southwest, and Dazhigu Subdistrict to the northwest. It had a total population of 94,762 as of 2010.

Its name Zhongshanmen originated in 1947, when the Nationalist government constructed a series of fortification in Tianjin during the Chinese Civil War. A huge metal gate was installed within this region, along with a inscription reading: "Zhongshanmen". Later people started to refer to the area by this name.

History

Administrative divisions 
At the end of 2021, Zhongshanmen Subdistrict was composed of 15 communities. They are listed in the table below:

References 

Township-level divisions of Tianjin
Hedong District, Tianjin